The House of Mihrān or House of Mehrān (Middle Persian: 𐭬𐭨𐭥𐭠𐭭; new Persian: مهران), was a leading Iranian noble family (šahrdārān), one of the Seven Great Houses of the Sassanid Persian Empire which claimed descent from the earlier Arsacid dynasty. A branch of the family formed the Mihranid line of the kings of Caucasian Albania and the Chosroid Dynasty of Kartli.

History 
First mentioned in a mid-3rd-century CE trilingual inscription at the Ka'ba-i Zartosht, concerning the political, military, and religious activities of Shapur I, the second Sassanid king of Iran, the family remained the hereditary "margraves" of Ray throughout the Sassanid period. Indeed, Procopius, in his History of the Wars, holds that the family name Mihran is a title equivalent to General.

Notable generals from the Mihran clan included: Shapur Mihran, who served as the marzban of Persian Armenia briefly in 482, Perozes, the Persian commander-in-chief during the Anastasian War and the Battle of Dara,Mihransitad, a diplomat of Khosrow I, Golon Mihran, who fought against the Byzantines in Armenia in 572–573, and Bahram Chobin, who led a coup against Khosrau II and briefly usurped the crown from 590 to 591, and Shahrwaraz, a commander of the last Roman-Persian war and a usurper.

In the course of the 4th century, the purported branches of this family acquired the crowns of three Caucasian polities: Iberia (Chosroids), Gogarene and Caucasian Albania/Gardman (Mihranids).

The much later Samanid dynasty that ruled most of Iran in the 9th and 10th centuries claimed descent from Bahrām Chōbin and thus the House of Mihran, though the veracity of this claim is unclear.

References

Sources 

 
Ancient history of the Caucasus
Families from the Sasanian Empire